Microlynchia is a genus of biting flies in the family of louse flies, Hippoboscidae. There are four known species. All species are parasites of birds. Microlynchia differs from Pseudolynchia in the presence of minute ocelli and a differently shaped scutellum.

Distribution 
Found throughout North and Central America, and parts of South America, Galápagos Islands.

Systematics 
Genus Microlynchia Lutz, 1915
Species group 'a'
Microlynchia crypturelli Bequaert, 1938
Microlynchia furtiva Bequaert, 1955
Microlynchia pusilla (Speiser, 1902)
Species group 'b'
Microlynchia galapagoensis Bequaert, 1955

References 

Hippoboscidae
Parasites of birds
Parasitic flies
Hippoboscoidea genera